End of the Road or similar may refer to:

Music
 End of the Road (Jerry Lee Lewis song), 1956
 End of the Road (Boyz II Men song), 1992
 "End of the Road", a song by Eddie Vedder from Into the Wild
 "End of the Road", a song by Sentenced from The Funeral Album
 End of the Road (Juice WRLD song), 2018
 End of the Road World Tour, a concert tour by Kiss
 End of the Road Festival, an annual music festival in England

Other uses
 "End of the Road" (Thunderbirds), an episode of the Supermarionation TV series Thunderbirds
 End of the Road (Torchwood), an episode of the TV series Torchwood: Miracle Day
 The End of the Road, John Barth's second novel (1958)
 The End of the Road (1919 film), a 1919 silent film
 The End of the Road (1936 film), a British musical film
 End of the Road (1944 film), an American film
 The End of the Road (1954 film), a British drama film
 End of the Road (1970 film), an American film
 End of the Road (2022 film), a 2022 Netflix American film
 The End of the Road (1976 film), a British documentary film
 The End of the Road, a 1989 novel and radio show by Tom Bodett
 "The End of the Road", an episode of the television series On the Yorkshire Buses

See also
 "It's the End of the Road", a 2006 song by Matt Goss